Papurana florensis is a species of true frog. It is native to the islands of Lombok, Sumbawa, and Flores in Indonesia. Common names Floresian frog and Flores frog have been coined for it.

Taxonomy
Based on molecular data, the previously very diverse genus Hylarana was split in several genera, many of them previously treated as subgenera, in 2015. Molecular data from Papurana florensis was not included in the study, and therefore its placement in Papurana is provisional, pending more morphological and molecular data.

Habitat and conservation
Papurana florensis is a lowland species that lives in wet areas of lowland dry forests and savannas, e.g., in marshes and streams. It is an uncommon species. Threats to it are unknown, as is its presence in protected areas.

References

florensis
Endemic fauna of Indonesia
Amphibians of Indonesia
Amphibians described in 1897
Taxa named by George Albert Boulenger